Ivy Shao is a Taiwanese actress, singer and model. She is best known for her leading role in the 2016 hit drama, Back to 1989. Since then, she has also starred in The Perfect Match with Wu Kang-jen and Ben Wu in 2017.

Career

2008–2010: Early beginnings
In 2008, she appeared on variety show, Guess, and gained fame. She then debuted in 2010 with the stage name Meng Meng as the spokesperson for the video game, "Meng Meng Online", and became a fixed cast on the variety show, Crazy God.

2011–2015: Start of her acting career
Shao received her first acting role in drama Skip Beat. She then went on to have supporting roles in several dramas, such as A Hint of You, Fabulous 30, Love at Second Sight, When I See You Again and Beautiful Secret.

2016–2017: Breakout role in Back to 1989, The Perfect Match
Her first breakthrough in the industry was when she received her first lead role in 2016 hit drama, Back to 1989 with Marcus Chang. The drama was the highest rated drama in recent years and was massively popular. She then followed up the drama with another leading role in 2017's The Perfect Match, co-starring with Wu Kang-jen.

2018-present: Foray into Mainland China and release of debut album, Drizzle
In 2018, Shao appeared in a mainland Chinese drama, HBS's Sweet Combat. She also played the lead role in EBC's Love & π, co-starring with Ben Wu. She then appeared in CSIC 2, playing the main lead in the second arc of the story.

In 2019, Shao also starred in the movies Stand By Me and Deep Evil, and appeared as a guest star in The 9th Precinct. In the same year, she released her debut album, Drizzle.

Shao is currently starring in Netflix and SETTV's collaboration, The Devil Punisher alongside Mike He.

Personal life
Shao went public with her relationship with The Perfect Match co-star, Wu Kang-jen in November 2020. They had previously dated for a year in 2018 before getting back together.

Filmography

Television

Film

Web drama

Music video appearances

Discography

Studio albums

Awards and nominations

References

External links

1989 births
21st-century Taiwanese actresses
Taiwanese television actresses
Taiwanese film actresses
Taiwanese female models
Actresses from Taipei
Living people